Gabriela Martinovová (born 14 November 1981) is a Czech alpine skier. She competed in three events at the 2002 Winter Olympics.

References

External links
 

1981 births
Living people
Czech female alpine skiers
Olympic alpine skiers of the Czech Republic
Alpine skiers at the 2002 Winter Olympics
People from Dvůr Králové nad Labem
Universiade gold medalists for the Czech Republic
Universiade medalists in alpine skiing
Competitors at the 2003 Winter Universiade
Sportspeople from the Hradec Králové Region